Oliver Jackson may refer to:
 Oliver Jackson (musician), American jazz drummer
 Oliver David Jackson, Australian Army officer
 Oliver Lee Jackson, American painter, printmaker, sculptor, and educator
 Oliver Toussaint Jackson, American businessman and entrepreneur
 Ollie Jackson, British racing driver

See also
 Oliver Jackson-Cohen, English actor and model